Makarovsky District is an administrative district (raion) of Sakhalin Oblast, Russia; one of the seventeen in the oblast. Municipally, it is incorporated as Makarovsky Urban Okrug. It is located in the southeast of the Island of Sakhalin. Its administrative center is the town of Makarov. Population:  The population of Makarov accounts for 78.2% of the district's total population.

References

Notes

Sources

Districts of Sakhalin Oblast